Sirius B is the twelfth full-length musical album by the symphonic metal band Therion. The album title refers to the star Sirius B. It was released simultaneously with Lemuria. The cover artwork was by Thomas Ewerhard.

Track listing

Development
In an interview with Global Domination, Johnsson said that the album title is a reference to the twin star to the ordinary Sirius A.

The album makes references to ancient culture and mythology:
Kingu was a monster in Sumerian mythology. According to Enûma Elish, all human beings were created from his blood after he was killed by Marduk.
Son of the Sun was the title of Pharaoh Akhenaten, who preferred to worship Aton, god of the Sun, over all other gods. His reign was unsuccessful, and people believed that other gods had cursed him.
Khlysti was a controversial Christian sect in Russia. Grigory Rasputin, the major character of the song, is believed to have been a member.
Persephone is the wife of Hades, the god of the dead in Greek mythology.
Kali Yuga in Hinduism is a dark age of suffering, the final era before the end of the world.
Land of Punt was a mysterious lost kingdom in ancient east Africa.
Melek Taus is the supreme deity of yazidi, his common shape is a peacock's.
Dagon is an ancient Semitic god of the sea. He appears in many H. P. Lovecraft books of Cthulhu mythos.
Georgy Gurdzhiev was an Armenian mystic philosopher and traveller, an expert in yazidi culture.

Personnel
Christofer Johnsson - rhythm guitar, mandolin ("The Wondrous World of Punt"), classical and choir arrangements
Kristian Niemann - rhythm and lead guitar, acoustic guitar, mandolin ("The Wondrous World of Punt")
Johan Niemann - bass guitar, mandolin ("The Wondrous World of Punt")

 Guest musicians
Richard Evensand - drums, gong ("Kali Yuga part 2")
Steen Rasmussen - Hammond organ
Lars Sømod Jensen - church organ
Mats Levén - lead vocals ("The Blood of Kingu", "The Khlysti Evangelist", "Kali Yuga part 2")
Piotr Wawrzeniuk - lead vocals ("Dark Venus Persephone", "Kali Yuga part 1", "Melek Taus")
Orchestra: City of Prague Philharmonic Orchestra (conducted by Adam Klemens and Mario Klemens)
Choir: Kūhn Mixed Choir (conducted by Mario Klemens)
Anna-Maria Krawe - lead and backing vocals

Charts

References

External links
 
 
 Information about album at the official website

2004 albums
Therion (band) albums
Nuclear Blast albums